The Kyrgyzstan national rugby union team represents Kyrgyzstan in international rugby union. Kyrgyzstan Federation of Rugby, which governs the sport of rugby in the country, it's a full member of Asia Rugby and an associate member of World Rugby since November 2004.

External links
 Kyrgyzstan on World.rugby

Asian national rugby union teams
Rugby union in Kyrgyzstan
Rugby